The Matrix Awards is an annual awards ceremony held by the Association for Women in Communications.

It started in 1970 to honor exceptional women in the fields of arts, advertising, entertainment, film, television, theater, books, broadcasting, magazines, newspapers, public relations and new media.

Past winners are Alice Walker, Eve Ensler, Katie Couric, Judy Corman, Anna Deavere Smith, Meryl Streep, Nora Ephron, Arianna Huffington, Toni Morrison, Barbara Walters, Rosie O'Donnell, Anna Quindlen, Elizabeth Winship, Meredith Vieira, Michelle Pfeiffer, Ellen DeGeneres, Christiane Amanpour, Amy Tan, Gloria Steinem, Thalía, Alix M. Freedman, Edie Falco, and Carla Hassan.

See also

 List of media awards honoring women

References

Mass media awards honoring women
Awards established in 1970